This article is a list of Easter-themed television episodes and specials, broadcast on or around Easter. The holiday itself may or may not feature in the episode.

Children/Family shows
 American Dragon: Jake Long: The Egg (2005)
 Arthur:  "Brain's Brain"/ "Brain Sees Stars" (2016)
 As Told by Ginger: The Easter Ham (2004)
 Bluey: Easter (2021)
 Brandy & Mr. Whiskers: Believe in the Bunny (2005)
 Bunnicula: The Chocolate Vampire Bunny (2018)
 Capitol Critters: Opie's Choice (1992)
 Codename: Kids Next Door: Operation: R.A.B.B.I.T.
 Curious George: "Flower Monkey / George and the Golden Egg Hunt" (2019) 
 Dora the Explorer:
 Egg Hunt (2003)
 Dora's Easter Adventure (2012)
 Fat Albert: The Fat Albert Easter Special (1982)
 Gabby's Dollhouse: "The Easter Kitty Bunny" (2022)
 Johnny Test: "It's Easter, Johnny Test!" (2014)
 Kate & Mim-Mim: Mim-Mim's Eggscellent Easter (2016)
 Katie and Orbie: How Orbie Helped the Easter Bunny (1995)
 The Life and Times of Juniper Lee: June's Egg-cellent Adventure: Juniper Lee Meets the Easter Bunny (2006)
 Little Charmers: Sparkle Bunny (2015)
 Looney Tunes:
 Easter Yeggs (1947)
 Bugs Bunny's Easter Special (1977)
 Daffy Duck's Easter Show (1980)
 Baby Looney Tunes: Eggs-traordinary Adventure (2003)
 New Looney Tunes: Easter Bunny Imposter / Easter Tweets (2018)
 Maisy: Eggs (1999)
 Max & Ruby: 
 Max's Chocolate Chicken (2002)
 Ruby's Easter Bonnet / Max's Easter Parade / Max & The Easter Bunny (2007)
 Ruby's Egg Hunt (2019)
 Mickey Mouse Clubhouse:
 Mickey's Great Clubhouse Hunt (2007)
 Mickey's Springtime Surprise (2010)
 My Friends Tigger & Pooh: Flowers for Eeyore / Easter Rabbit (2009)
 Pac-Man and the Ghostly Adventures: Easter Egg Island (2015)
 PAW Patrol:
 Pups Save the Easter Egg Hunt (2014)
 Pups Save a Sweet Mayor / Pups Save a Magic Trick (2021)
 Peppa Pig: Spring (2010) / Easter Bunny (2017) 
 The Pink Panther: The Easter Panther (1993)
 Postcards from Buster: A Capital Egg Hunt (2007)
 Rolie Polie Olie: A Polie Egg-Stravaganza (2000)
 Rugrats: Bow Wow Wedding Vows (2002)
 Sid the Science Kid: Rock N Roll Easter (2012)
 The Smurfs Springtime Special (1982)
 Special Agent Oso: Dye Another Egg (2012)
 SpongeBob SquarePants: Bunny Hunt (2018)
 Stuck in the Middle: Stuck in the Diaz Easter (2017)
 Team Umizoomi: Umi Egg Hunt (2011)
 Teen Titans Go!:
 The Teen Titans Go Easter Holiday Classic (2016)
 Easter Creeps (2017)
 Booty Egg (2019)
 Egg Hunt (2020)
 Feed Me (2021)
 Easter Annihilation (2023)
 Teenage Mutant Ninja Turtles (1987): The Turtles and the Hare(1991)
 Teletubbies: Painting Easter Eggs/Finding Chocolate Eggs (1998)
 Uncle Grandpa: "Uncle Easter" (2016)
 Total DramaRama: There Are No Hoppy Endings (2019)
 VeggieTales:
 An Easter Carol (2003)
 'Twas the Night Before Easter (2011)
 Wallykazam!: Hopgoblin (2015)
 Winnie the Pooh: Springtime with Roo (2004)
 Wild Kratts: In Search of the Easter Bunny (2020)
 Wordgirl: 
 Invasion of The Bunny Lovers (2014)
 Ears to You (2014)
 The Wonder Pets: Help The Easter Bunny (2010)

Comedy 

 The Cannon and Ball Show: "The Cannon & Ball Easter Show" (1983)
 The Righteous Gemstones: "And Yet One of You Is a Devil" (2019)

Drama
 Beverly Hills 90210: "The Easter Bunny" (2000)
 Big Love: "Easter" (2006)
 Bonanza: "Caution, Easter Bunny Crossing" (1970)
 The Waltons: "An Easter Story" (1973)
 The Waltons: "A Walton Easter" Reunion Special (1997)
 Doctor Who : "Planet of the Dead" (2009)
 Doctor Who : "Legend of the Sea Devils" (2022)

Sitcoms
 Alice: "Here Comes Alice Cottontail" (1980)
 Baby Blues: "The Bad Family" (2002)
 Baskets: "Easter in Bakersfield" (2016)
Beef House: "Army Buddy Brad" (2020)
 Better Things: "Easter" (2019)
 Black-ish: "North Star" (2018)
 Bless the Harts: "Easter's 11" (2021)
 Brooklyn Nine-Nine: "Valloweaster" (2020)
 Bob's Burgers: "Eggs for Days" (2017)
 Difficult People: "Passover Bump" (2017)
 The Drew Carey Show: "The Easter Show" (2001)
 Everybody Hates Chris: "Everybody Hates Easter" (2008)
 Everybody Loves Raymond: "The Canister" (2001)
 Family Guy: "Family Goy" (2009)
 Father Ted: "Cigarettes and Alcohol and Rollerblading" (1996)
 The Fresh Prince of Bel-Air: "Hare Today..." (1996)
 Happy Days: "Three on a Porch" (1975)
 The Jack Benny Program: "Easter Show" (1960)
 The Jackie Gleason Show: "Easter Hats" (1953)
 Letterkenny: "Super Hard Easter" (2016)
 Life With Elizabeth: "Easter Eggs" (1952)
 M*A*S*H: "Private Charles Lamb" (1974)
 McHale's Navy: "Chuckie Cottontail" (1965)
 NewsRadio: "Office Feud" (1997)
 The Real O'Neals: "The Real Lent" (2017)
 The Simpsons: 
 "Simpsons Bible Stories" (1999)
  "The Last of the Red Hat Mamas" (2005)
  "Dark Knight Court" (2013)
 South Park:
 "Fantastic Easter Special" (2007)
 "Jewpacabra" (2012)
 Stuck in the Middle: "Stuck in the Diaz Easter" (2017)
 Superstore:
 "Easter" (2019)
 "California (Part 1)" (2020)
 Vicar of Dibley: "The Easter Bunny" (1996)

Specials
 A Claymation Easter (1992)
 A Chucklewood Easter (1987)
 A Family Circus Easter (1982)
 An Easter Story (Showtime) (1983)
 Jesus of Nazareth (ABC) (1977)
 Andy Williams and the NBC Kids: Easter in Rome (1987)
 Bugs Bunny's Easter Special (1977)
 Daffy Duck's Easter Show (1980)
 Easter Egg Mornin' (1991)
 Easter Is (1974)
 Easter Land (2019)
 Easterland 2 (2020)
 Here Comes Peter Cottontail (1971)
 Hodge Saves Easter (2020)
 Ice Age: The Great Egg-Scapade (2016)
 It's the Easter Beagle, Charlie Brown (1974)
 The Last Hangover aka Especial de Natal: Se Beber, Não Ceie (2018)
 Peter and the Magic Egg (1983)
 Perry Como's Easter by the Sea (1978)
 Perry Como's Easter in Guadalajara (1982)
 The Berenstain Bears' Easter Surprise (1981)
 The Easter Bunny Is Comin' to Town (1977)
 The Easter Chipmunk (1995)
 The Easter Egg (1987)
 The First Easter Rabbit (1976)
 Yogi the Easter Bear (1994)
 Easter Fever (1980)

See also
 List of films set around Easter
 List of United States Christmas television episodes
 List of Christmas television specials
 List of Halloween television specials
 List of St. Patrick's Day television specials
 List of Thanksgiving television specials
 List of Valentine's Day television specials

References

 
Lists of television episodes by holiday
Lists of television specials